Ribeirão Chiqueiro is a village in the southcentral part of the island of Santiago, Cape Verde. It is part of the municipality of São Domingos. It is 5 km southeast of the municipal seat São Domingos. In 2010 its population was 775. Its elevation is around 270 m. The national road EN1-ST01 (Praia - Assomada - Tarrafal) passes near the village.

References

Villages and settlements in Santiago, Cape Verde
São Domingos Municipality, Cape Verde